The 2005 Florida Gators baseball team represented the University of Florida in the sport of baseball during the 2005 college baseball season. The Gators competed in Division I of the National Collegiate Athletic Association (NCAA) and the Eastern Division of the Southeastern Conference (SEC). They played their home games at Alfred A. McKethan Stadium, on the university's Gainesville, Florida campus. The team was coached by Pat McMahon, who was in his fourth season at Florida.

Roster

Schedule 

! style="background:#FF4A00;color:white;"| Regular season
|- valign="top" 

|- align="center" bgcolor="ffdddd"
| February 11  ||||No. 22
| McKethan Stadium ||4–511
|Parnell (2–1)
|O'Day (0–1)
|None
|2,372
|0–1||–
|- align="center" bgcolor="ddffdd"
| February 12  ||Charleston Southern||No. 22
| McKethan Stadium ||3–2||O'Day (1–1)
|Evans (0–1)
|None
|2,483
|1–1
|–
|- align="center" bgcolor="ddffdd"
| February 13  ||Charleston Southern||No. 22
| McKethan Stadium ||15–6||Ball (1–0)
|Parnell (2–2)
|None
|2,086
|2–1
|–
|- align="center" bgcolor="ddffdd"
| February 15  ||||
|McKethan Stadium
|17–2||Locke (1–0)
|Tavernier (0–2)
|None
|1,523
|3–1
|–
|- align="center" bgcolor="ffdddd"
| February 18  ||No. 2 Rivalry||
|McKethan Stadium||7–9||Camardese (1–0)
|Falkenbach (0–1)
|Gil (2)
|4,169
|3–2
|–
|- align="center" bgcolor="ddffdd"
| February 19  ||No. 2 Miami (FL)Rivalry||
|McKethan Stadium||2–111
|O'Day (2–1)
|Orta (1–1)
|None
|4,531
|4–2
|–
|- align="center" bgcolor="ddffdd"
| February 20  ||No. 2 Miami (FL)Rivalry||
|McKethan Stadium||14-11||Boss (1–0)
|Perez (2–1)
|None
|5,178
|5–2
|–
|- align="center" bgcolor="ddffdd"
| February 22  ||Florida A&M||No. 18
|McKethan Stadium||18–3||Pete (1–0)
|Patrick (0–3)
|None
|1,597
|6–2
|–
|- align="center" bgcolor="ddffdd"
| February 25  ||||No. 18
|McKethan Stadium||5–4||Horne (1–0)
|Frederick (0–1)
|Falkenbach (1)
|713
|7–2||–
|- align="center" bgcolor="ddffdd"
| February 26  ||Rhode Island||No. 18
|McKethan Stadium
|6–0||Ball (2–0)
|Zuercher (0–1)
|None
|1,656
|8–2||–
|-

|- align="center" bgcolor="ddffdd"
| March 1  ||||No. 10|| McKethan Stadium ||13–1||Boss (2–0)||Bedrosian (1–1)||None||1,272||9–2||–
|- align="center" bgcolor="ffdddd"
| March 4  ||||No. 10|| McKethan Stadium ||1–11||Allen (2–0)||Horne (1–1)||None||1,338||9–3||–
|- align="center" bgcolor="ddffdd"
| March 5  ||Villanova||No. 10||McKethan Stadium||6–5||Ball (3–0)||Aust (0–1)||O'Day (1)||2,243||10–3
|–
|- align="center" bgcolor="ddffdd"
| March 6  ||Villanova||No. 10|| McKethan Stadium ||6–510||O'Day (3–1)||Wendler (0–1)||None||2,689||11–3
|–
|- align="center" bgcolor="ddffdd"
| March 8  ||||No. 13|| McKethan Stadium ||8–1||Locke (2–0)||White (1–1)||Falkenbach (2)||1,418||12–3
|–
|- align="center" bgcolor="ffdddd"
| March 9  ||UNC Asheville||No. 13||McKethan Stadium||5–8||Baughn (1–0)||O'Day (3–2)||None||329||12–4||–
|- align="center" bgcolor="ddffdd"
| March 11  ||||No. 13||McKethan Stadium||17–1||Ball (4–0)||Day (2–1)||None||1,673||13–4||–
|- align="center" bgcolor="ddffdd"
| March 12  ||Michigan State||No. 13||McKethan Stadium||13–2||Boss (3–0)||Brookes (0–1)||None||2,138||14–4||–
|- align="center" bgcolor="ddffdd"
| March 13  ||Michigan State||No. 13|| McKethan Stadium ||10–0||Locke (3–0)||Malec (1–1)||None||1,493||15–4||–
|- align="center" bgcolor="ddffdd"
| March 18  ||at No. 20 ||No. 10||Swayze FieldOxford, MS||5–4||Ball (5–0)||Maloney (4–1)||Falkenbach (3)||3,320||16–4||1–0
|- align="center" bgcolor="ffdddd"
| March 19  ||at No. 20 Ole Miss||No. 10||Swayze Field||4–10||Head (4–0)||Horne (1–2)||None||3,506||16–5||1–1
|- align="center" bgcolor="ffdddd"
| March 20  ||at No. 20 Ole Miss||No. 10||Swayze Field||2–3||Cupps (4–1)||Boss (3–1)||Maloney (2)||3,180||16–6||1–2
|- align="center" bgcolor="ddffdd"
| March 22  ||No. 20 ||No. 12|| McKethan Stadium ||17–6||O'Day (4–2)||Petracca (0–1)||None||1,734||17–6||–
|- align="center" bgcolor="ffdddd"
| March 25  ||No. 6 ||No. 12||McKethan Stadium||0–2||Rawl (5–2)||Ball (5–1)||Fletcher (2)||2,376||17–7||1–3
|- align="center" bgcolor="ddffdd"
| March 26  ||No. 6 South Carolina||No. 12||McKethan Stadium||7–3||Boss (4–1)||McCamie (5–1)||O'Day (2)||1,238||18–7||2–3
|- align="center" bgcolor="ddffdd"
| March 27  ||No. 6 South Carolina||No. 12||McKethan Stadium||6–1||Falkenbach (1–1)||Fletcher (2–1)||None||1,583||19–7||3–3
|- align="center" bgcolor="ddffdd"
| March 30  ||at No. 6 Rivalry||No. 9||Dick Howser StadiumTallahassee, FL||9–2||Locke (4–0)||Jones (4–1)||None||5,678||20–7||–
|-

|- align="center" bgcolor="ddffdd"
| April 1  ||||No. 9|| McKethan Stadium ||10–9||Porter (1–0)||Baber (0–1)||None||1,652||21–7||4–3
|- align="center" bgcolor="ddffdd"
| April 2  ||Kentucky||No. 9|| McKethan Stadium ||20-11||Pete (2–0)||Albers (3–2)||None||2,613||22–7||5–3
|- align="center" bgcolor="ddffdd"
| April 3  ||Kentucky||No. 9||McKethan Stadium||11–6||O'Day (5–2)||Baber (0–2)||None||2,043||23–7||6–3
|- align="center" bgcolor="ffdddd"
| April 8  ||at ||No. 6||Foley FieldAthens, GA||2–5||Hyle (2–2)||Boss (4–2)||Startup (4)||2,421||23–8||6–4
|- align="center" bgcolor="ddffdd"
| April 9  ||at Georgia||No. 6||Foley Field||12–1||Horne (2–2)||Ruthven (1–3)||None||3,717||24–8||7–4
|- align="center" bgcolor="ddffdd"
| April 10  ||at Georgia||No. 6||Foley Field||10–1||Locke (5–0)||Startup (3–2)||None||3,021||25–8||8–4
|- align="center" bgcolor="ddffdd"
| April 15  ||No. 17 ||No. 7|| McKethan Stadium ||9–8||Falkenbach (2–1)||Large (5–3)||O'Day (3)||2,886||26–8||9–4
|- align="center" bgcolor="ddffdd"
| April 16  ||No. 17 Alabama||No. 7||McKethan Stadium||7–4||Horne (3–2)||LeBlanc (2–2)||O'Day (4)||3,643||27–8||10–4
|- align="center" bgcolor="ffdddd"
| April 17  ||No. 17 Alabama||No. 7|| McKethan Stadium ||6–9||Robertson (6–2)||O'Day (5–3)||None||2,846||27–9||10–5
|- align="center" bgcolor="ffdddd"
| April 19  ||at No. 14 Florida StateRivalry||No. 6||Dick Howser Stadium||2–4||Henry (3–2)||Wynn (0–1)||Chambliss (11)||5,045||27–10||–
|- align="center" bgcolor="ddffdd"
| April 22  ||at No. 23 ||No. 6||Plainsman ParkAuburn, AL||4–2||Boss (5–2)||Hughey (3–4)||O'Day (5)||2,903||28–10||11–5
|- align="center" bgcolor="ddffdd"
| April 23  ||at No. 23 Auburn||No. 6||Plainsman Park||5–4||Horne (4–2)||Sullivan (6–4)||Falkenbach (4)||3,422||29–10||12–5
|- align="center" bgcolor="ddffdd"
| April 24  ||at No. 23 Auburn||No. 6||Plainsman Park||6–3||Falkenbach (3–1)||Madden (6–1)||None||3,036||30–10||13–5
|- align="center" bgcolor="ffdddd"
| April 29  ||No. 19 ||No. 3|| McKethan Stadium ||5–11||Hochevar (10–2)||Boss (5–3)||None||4,023||30–11||13–6
|- align="center" bgcolor="ddffdd"
| April 30  ||No. 19 Tennessee||No. 3|| McKethan Stadium ||18–9||Horne (5–2)||Adkins (6–2)||None||2,538||31–11||14–6
|-

|- align="center" bgcolor="ffdddd"
| May 1  ||No. 19 Tennessee||No. 3|| McKethan Stadium ||2–7||Cobb (5–2)||Ball (5–2)||None||1,632||31–12||14–7
|- align="center" bgcolor="ffdddd"
| May 3  ||No. 15 Florida StateRivalry||No. 4|| McKethan Stadium ||4–9||Sauls (5–1)||Locke (5–1)||Chambliss (12)||5,483||31–13||–
|- align="center" bgcolor="ffdddd"
| May 6  ||at ||No. 4||Baum StadiumFayetteville, AR||1–4||Schmidt (7–1)||Ball (5–3)||None||7,602||31–14||14–8
|- align="center" bgcolor="ffdddd"
| May 7  ||at Arkansas||No. 4||Baum Stadium||2–310||–||Falkenbach (3–2)||–||–||31–15||14–9
|- align="center" bgcolor="ddffdd"
| May 8  ||at Arkansas||No. 4||Baum Stadium||11-10||Boss (6–3)||Smith (1–2)||Falkenbach (5)||6,678||32–15||15–9
|- align="center" bgcolor="ffdddd"
| May 10  ||||No. 12|| McKethan Stadium ||7–8||Pryor (4–3)||Porter (1–1)||Mattison (7)||1,528||32–16||–
|- align="center" bgcolor="ffdddd"
| May 11  ||at South Florida||No. 12||Red McEwen FieldTampa, FL||5–11||Manganaro (1–2)||Wynn (0–2)||Bilardello (1)||1,078||32–17||–
|- align="center" bgcolor="ddffdd"
| May 13  ||Mississippi State||No. 12|| McKethan Stadium ||8–2||Ball (6–3)||Johnson (3–6)||None||2,429||33–17||16–9
|- align="center" bgcolor="ddffdd"
| May 14  ||Mississippi State||No. 12|| McKethan Stadium ||2–1||Horne (6–2)||Doolittle (4–7)||None||2,577||34–17||17–9
|- align="center" bgcolor="ffdddd"
| May 15  ||Mississippi State||No. 12|| McKethan Stadium ||5–6||Valentine (5–0)||Falkenbach (3–3)||None||2,539||34–18||17–10
|- align="center" bgcolor="ddffdd"
| May 18  ||||No. 12|| McKethan Stadium ||6–4||Pete (3–0)||Elsemiller (3–4)||Falkenbach (6)||1,637||35–18
|–
|- align="center" bgcolor="ddffdd"
| May 20  ||at ||No. 12||Hawkins FieldNashville, TN||5–4||Horne (7–2)||Lewis (8–3)||Falkenbach (7)||1,563||36–18
|18–10
|- align="center" bgcolor="ddffdd"
| May 21  ||at Vanderbilt||No. 12||Hawkins Field||2–113||O'Day (6–3)||Sues (3–5)||Pete (1)||1,673||37–18
|19–10
|- align="center" bgcolor="ddffdd"
| May 22  ||at Vanderbilt||No. 12||Hawkins Field||6–3||Pete (4–0)||Buschmann (4–3)||Falkenbach (8)||1,819||38–18
|20–10
|-

|-
! style="background:#FF4A00;color:white;"| Post-season
|-

|- align="center" bgcolor="ddffdd"
| May 25  ||vs. Arkansas||No. 7||Metropolitan StadiumHoover, AL||9–8||O'Day (7–3)||Boyce (10–8)||None||11,318||39–18||1–0
|- align="center" bgcolor="ddffdd"
| May 26  ||vs. No. 21 Ole Miss||No. 7||Metropolitan Stadium||10–7||Porter (2–1)||Head (7–3)||O'Day (6)||7,482||40–18||2–0
|- align="center" bgcolor="ffdddd"
| May 28 (1) ||vs. No. 21 Ole Miss||No. 7||Metropolitan Stadium||1–147||Cupps (8–3)||Ball (6–4)||None||6,162||40–19||2–1
|- align="center" bgcolor="ffdddd"
| May 28 (2) ||vs. No. 21 Ole Miss||No. 7||Metropolitan Stadium||2–4||Baumgardner (2–1)||Boss (6–4)||Stone (1)||6,162||40–20||2–2
|-

|- align="center" bgcolor="ddffdd"
| June 4 (1) ||Stetson||No. 8|| McKethan Stadium ||8–3||Ball (7–4)||Ingoglia (8–4)||None||3,670||41–20||1–0
|- align="center" bgcolor="ddffdd"
| June 4 (2) ||No. 21 ||No. 8|| McKethan Stadium ||5–2||Boss (7–4)||Miller (8–4)||None||4,740||42–20||2–0
|- align="center" bgcolor="ddffdd"
| June 5 ||||No. 8|| McKethan Stadium ||23–3||Horne (8–2)||Korpi (4–3)||None||4,851||43–20||3–0
|-

|- align="center" bgcolor="ddffdd"
| June 10 ||No. 14 Florida StateRivalry||No. 8|| McKethan Stadium ||8–1||Boss (8–4)||Henry (9–3)||None||5,250||44–20||1–0
|- align="center" bgcolor="ddffdd"
| June 11 ||No. 14 Florida StateRivalry||No. 8|| McKethan Stadium ||8–5||Horne (9–2)||Sauls (6–2)||Falkenbach (9)||5,698||45–20||2–0
|-

|- align="center" bgcolor="ddffdd"
| June 17 ||vs. No. 7 Tennessee||No. 6||Rosenblatt StadiumOmaha, NE||6–4||Horne (10–2)||Hochevar (15–3)||O'Day (7)||21,546||46–20||1–0
|- align="center" bgcolor="ddffdd"
| June 19 ||vs. No. 3 Nebraska||No. 6||Rosenblatt Stadium||7–4||O'Day (8–3)||Dorn (12–2)||None||26,813||47–20||2–0
|- align="center" bgcolor="ffdddd"
| June 22 ||vs. No. 8 Arizona State||No. 6||Rosenblatt Stadium||1–6||Averill (11–4)||Ball (7–5)||None||–||47–21||2–1
|- align="center" bgcolor="ddffdd"
| June 23 ||vs. No. 8 Arizona State||No. 6||Rosenblatt Stadium||6–3||Boss (9–4)||Bordes (5–7)||None||16,819||48–21||3–1
|-
! colspan=10|Finals || width="5%" | Record
|- align="center" bgcolor="ffdddd"
| June 25 ||vs. No. 5 Texas||No. 6||Rosenblatt Stadium||2–4||Alaniz (8–3)||Locke (5–2)||Cox (18)||25,958||48–22||0–1
|- align="center" bgcolor="ffdddd"
| June 26 ||vs. No. 5 Texas||No. 6||Rosenblatt Stadium||2–6||McCulloch (12–4)||Ball (7–6)||Cox (19)||19,836||48–23||0–2
|-

|Rankings from Collegiate Baseball. All times Eastern. Retrieved from FloridaGators.com

See also 
 Florida Gators
 List of Florida Gators baseball players

References

External links 
 Gator Baseball official website

Florida Gators baseball seasons
Florida Gators baseball team
Florida Gators
College World Series seasons
Florida